Paragodon paragoides is a small (4–5 mm) hoverfly which differs from other hoverflies by its simple male genitalia, and was accordingly considered the most primitive microdontine species. It is the sole member of the genus Paragodon, as the other known species was removed to a separate genus, Surimyia.

Biology
Larvae are presumably found in ant nests.

Distribution
They are native to South America.

References

Hoverfly genera
Microdontinae
Monotypic Brachycera genera
Diptera of South America